The River Vale Public Schools is a comprehensive community public school district that serves students in pre-kindergarten through eighth grade in River Vale, Bergen County, New Jersey, United States.

As of the 2020–21 school year, the district, comprised of three schools, had an enrollment of 1,073 students and 94.2 classroom teachers (on an FTE basis), for a student–teacher ratio of 11.4:1.

The district is classified by the New Jersey Department of Education as being in District Factor Group "I", the second-highest of eight groupings. District Factor Groups organize districts statewide to allow comparison by common socioeconomic characteristics of the local districts. From lowest socioeconomic status to highest, the categories are A, B, CD, DE, FG, GH, I and J.

River Vale's public high school students attend Pascack Valley High School in Hillsdale, together with students from Hillsdale, as part of the Pascack Valley Regional High School District. As of the 2020–21 school year, the high school had an enrollment of 1,087 students and 93.2 classroom teachers (on an FTE basis), for a student–teacher ratio of 11.7:1.

Awards and recognition
For the 2005–06 school year, the district was recognized with the "Best Practices Award" by the New Jersey Department of Education for its "Aloha Hawaii" Social Studies program at Roberge Elementary School.

Also during the 2005–06 school year, all three of the district's schools - Holdrum Middle School, Roberge Elementary School, and Woodside Elementary School - won the "National PTA Parent Involvement Award," a designation which lasts for three years.  At the time, only three other schools in the state of New Jersey had been so named. Two Holdrum Middle School students, both Grade 7, were recognized in December 2008 for their participation in the Bergen County Middle School Chorus. Five Holdrum Middle School students, in grades 7 and 8, were recognized in December 2011 for their participation in the Bergen County Middle School Chorus, and one student, in Grade 7, was recognized for participation in the Bergen County Middle School Band.

During the 2011–12 school year, one of the district's middle school robotics teams was the overall champion at the Northern New Jersey Regional Qualifying Tournament, as well as at the New Jersey State Finals Championship Tournament. They qualified for the 2011 World Championship Festival.

During the 2012–13 school year, the robotics team repeated as regional and state champions. They are the only public school team to win the state championship twice.

Schools 
Schools in the district (with 2020–21 enrollment data from the National Center for Education Statistics) are:;Elementary schools
Roberge Elementary School with 302 students in pre-kindergarten to fifth grade
Stephen A. Wren, Principal
Woodside Elementary School with 342 students in kindergarten to fifth grade
Justin Jasper, Principal
Middle school
Holdrum Middle School with 413 students in grades sixth to eighth
James P. Cody, Principal
Alyson L. Puzzo, Assistant Principal

Administration 
Core members of the district's administration are:
Melissa Signore, Superintendent of Schools
Kelly Ippolito, Business Administrator / Board Secretary

RVEF's A.C.E. Before and After School Program 
The River Vale Educational Fund's Activity, Caring and Enrichment (A.C.E.) Before & After School Program is designed to supervise and care for the students of both of the elementary schools in the district, including those at Roberge and Woodside, as well as elementary schools in the surrounding communities of Hillsdale, Emerson and Norwood.

Board of education
The district's board of education, comprised of seven members, sets policy and oversees the fiscal and educational operation of the district through its administration. As a Type II school district, the board's trustees are elected directly by voters to serve three-year terms of office on a staggered basis, with either two or three seats up for election each year held (since 2012) as part of the November general election. The board appoints a superintendent to oversee the district's day-to-day operations and a business administrator to supervise the business functions of the district.

References

External links 
River Vale Public Schools

River Vale Schools, National Center for Education Statistics
Pascack Valley Regional High School District

River Vale, New Jersey
New Jersey District Factor Group I
School districts in Bergen County, New Jersey